Eva Under Fire is an American rock band from Detroit, Michigan. The band consists of lead vocalist Eva Marie, guitarists Rob Lyberg and Chris Slapnik, bassist Ed Gawlik, and drummer Corey Newsom.

The band has been named as one of the "Artists To Watch" in 2023 by Pandora Radio.

Their song "Blow" was ranked #11 on Mainstream Rock Airplay and #33 on Rock & Alternative Airplay.  The Album Love, Drugs & Misery came in at #99 on Top Current Album Sales.

Members
 Amanda "Eva Marie" Lyberg - Vocals
 Rob Lyberg - Lead guitar
 Chris Slapnik - Rhythm guitar
 Ed Gawlik - Bass
 Corey Newsom - Drums

Former members
 Jeff Llewellyn - Bass

Discography

Studio albums 
 Anchors (2015)
 Love, Drugs & Misery (2022)

Singles

References 

Musical groups from Michigan
American alternative metal musical groups
Musical groups established in 2015
2015 establishments in Michigan